The 2003 Washington Huskies football team was an American football team that represented the University of Washington during the 2003 NCAA Division I-A football season.  In its first season under head coach Keith Gilbertson, the team compiled a 6–6 record, finished in a three-way tie for fifth place in the Pacific-10 Conference at 4–4, and was outscored 316 to 312.

Schedule

Roster

NFL Draft
Four Huskies were selected in the 2004 NFL Draft, which lasted seven rounds (255 selections).

References

Washington
Washington Huskies football seasons
Washington Huskies football